Gerhard Michalski (25 June 1917 – 22 February 1946) was a German Luftwaffe military aviator and wing commander during World War II. As a fighter ace, he is credited with 73 aerial victories in 652 missions, of which 59 victories were achieved over the Western Front including 13 four-engine bombers, and 14 over the Eastern Front. He was awarded the Knight's Cross of the Iron Cross with Oak Leaves, the highest award in the military and paramilitary forces of Nazi Germany during World War II.

Early life and career
Michalski was born on 25 June 1917 in Augsdorf in the Province of Saxony of the German Empire. In 1936, he volunteered for military service in the Luftwaffe and was promoted to Leutnant in 1938.

World War II

Michalski joined 6. Staffel (6th squadron) of Jagdgeschwader 53 (JG 53—53rd Fighter Wing) in 1940. His first victory was on 31 March 1940, when he downed a French Morane Saulnier MS 406 fighter over the French border. Flying through the Battle of Britain, he gained eight more victories. In October 1940, Michalski was appointed Adjutant in II./JG 53. 
With JG 53 participating in the invasion of Russia from June 1941 onward, Michalski claimed 13 further victories by the end of August 1941 for a total of 22.

On 5 October 1941, II. Gruppe of JG 53 was withdrawn from the Eastern Front and ordered to Insterburg, present-day Chernyakhovsk. The Gruppe was then sent to Leeuwarden Airfield in the Netherlands where they arrived on 12. October. Prior to the relocation, Michalski was appointed Staffelkapitän (squadron leader) of 4. Staffel of JG 53, relacing Oberleutnant Kurt Liedtke in this capacity.

Mediterranean theater
In November 1941, II./JG 53 were relocated to Sicily for operations against Malta. Michalski was to become the most successful German fighter pilot in the Siege of Malta, claiming 26 victories against the island's defenders. Michalski was appointed Gruppenkommandeur (group commander) of II. Gruppe of JG 53 in August 1942. He succeeded Hauptmann Walter Spies who was transferred. Command of 4. Staffel was then passed to Oberleutnant Wilhelm Hobirk. He was awarded the Knight's Cross of the Iron Cross for 41 victories in September.

On 15 October, Michalski was shot down in his Bf 109 G-2 (Werknummer 10484—factory number). He bailed out over sea, climbed into his life raft before he was picked by a Dornier Do 24 flying boat of Seenotstaffel 6, the 6th Squadron of the German air-sea rescue service. His victors were No. 126 Squadron Supermarine Spitfire fighters, flown by F/L. Jones and F/Sgt Varey, who shot him down off Marsaxlokk Bay.

In November 1942, II./JG 53 were sent to Tunisia. Following the fall of Tunisia, II./JG 53 relocated to bases in Sicily in May 1943. By June 1943, the Geschwaderkommodore (wing commander) of JG 53, Oberst Günther Freiherr von Maltzahn, had fallen ill and could no longer lead JG 53 during combat missions. In consequence, Michalski was tasked with leading the air elements of JG 53. On 13 June, Michalski claimed a Supermarin Spitfire fighter shot down near Syracuse. His opponent may have been Wing Commander John Ellis who bailed out and was taken prisoner of war.

On 18 June 1943, II. Gruppe engaged in combat with eight Spitfire fighters over southeast Sicily. In this encounter, Michalski was shot down in his Bf 109 G-6 (Werknummer 16362) near Donnafugata Castle. Forced to bail out, he was injured and taken to hospital in Ragusa. His victor was F/O G. Keith Royal Canadian Air Force (RCAF), flying a Spitfire of No. 72 Squadron. He bailed out wounded in the leg and with a broken ankle, landing in the sea, from where he was rescued by the German air-sea rescue service. Hospitalised, he returned to JG 53 in August 1943.

In November 1943, II./JG 53 was relocated to airfields in Austria, operating on Reichsverteidigung (Defense of the Reich) duties. Michalski claimed his 60th victory on 2 November.

Wing commander
On 24 April 1944, Michalski was made Geschwaderkommodore of the newly formed Jagdgeschwader z.b.V. (JG z.b.V.—fighter wing for special deployement), a special purpose unit which was tasked with defending the southern German airspace under control of 7. Jagd-Division (7th Fighter Division). Initially, the unit was based at Kassel and equipped with the Bf 109 G-6. On 29 April, the United States Army Air Forces (USAAF) Eighth Air Force headed for Berlin. Michalski led the Stab and II. Gruppe of Jagdgeschwader 27 (JG 27—27th Fighter Wing) on the intercept mission. Near Schandelah, present-day part of Cremlingen, he shot down a Boeing B-17 Flying Fortress bomber. On 1 May, the Eighth Air Force attacked German railroad infrastructure in southern Germany. Defending against this attack, Michalski was shot down by USAAF escorting fighters in his Bf 109 G-6 (Werknummer 440232) near Saarbrücken. Due to his injuries, he was taken off duty. The position of Geschwaderkommodore was left vacant until on 21 May Major Walther Dahl was given command of JG z.b.V.

Following his recovery, Michalski was transferred to the Verbandsführerschule of the General der Jagdflieger on 20 May 1944. On 21 July, he joined the Stabsstaffel, I./Jagdgeschwader 11 before being appointed Geschwaderkommodore of Jagdgeschwader 4 on 18 August 1944. Major Michalski was awarded the Knight's Cross of the Iron Cross with Oak Leaves on 25 November for 72 victories. On 1 January 1945, Michalski was promoted to Oberstleutnant (lieutenant colonel). He gained his 73rd and final victory on 8 March 1945, over the Eastern Front.

As Geschwaderkommodore, Michalski was ordered to Berlin on 22 January 1945 and attended the meeting with Reichsmarschall Hermann Göring which was later dubbed the Fighter Pilots' Mutiny. This was an attempt to reinstate Generalleutnant Adolf Galland as General der Jagdflieger who had been dismissed for outspokenness regarding the Oberkommando der Luftwaffe (Luftwaffe high command), and had been replaced by Oberst Gordon Gollob. The meeting was held at the Haus der Flieger in Berlin and was attended by a number of high-ranking fighter pilot leaders which included Michalski, Günther Lützow, Hannes Trautloft, Hermann Graf, Erich Leie, Helmut Bennemann, Kurt Bühligen and Herbert Ihlefeld, and their antagonist Göring supported by his staff Bernd von Brauchitsch and Karl Koller. The fighter pilots, with Lützow taking the lead as spokesman, criticized Göring and made him personally responsible for the decisions taken which effectively had led to the lost air war over Europe.

Michalski was involved in a motor vehicle accident on 22 February 1946 and died in a hospital in Kaltenkirchen. His brother Werner was killed in action as a Leutnant on 10 April 1942 serving with Jagdgeschwader 26 "Schlageter".

Summary of career

Aerial victory claims
According to Spick, Michalski was credited with 73 aerial victories in 652 missions, of which 59 victories were achieved over the Western Front including 13 four-engine bombers and 29 Supermarine Spitfire fighters. Mathews and Foreman, authors of Luftwaffe Aces — Biographies and Victory Claims, researched the German Federal Archives and found records for 68 aerial victory claims, plus three further unconfirmed claims. This number includes 14 on the Eastern Front and 54 on the Western Front, including 11 four-engined bombers.

Victory claims were logged to a map-reference (PQ = Planquadrat), for example "PQ 03 Ost 9848". These sectors were then subdivided into 36 smaller units to give a location area 3 × 4 km in size.

Awards
 Iron Cross (1939)
 2nd Class (28 September 1939)
 1st Class (3 September 1940)
 Knight's Cross of the Iron Cross with Oak Leaves
 Knight's Cross on 4 September 1942 as Oberleutnant and Staffelkapitän of the 4./Jagdgeschwader 53
 667th Oak Leaves on 25 November 1944 as Major and Geschwaderkommodore of Jagdgeschwader 4

Notes

References

Citations

Bibliography

 
 
 
 
 
 
 
 
 
 
 
 
 
 
 
 
 
 
 
 
 
 
 

1917 births
1946 deaths
Luftwaffe pilots
German World War II flying aces
People from the Province of Saxony
Recipients of the Knight's Cross of the Iron Cross with Oak Leaves
Road incident deaths in Germany
Military personnel from Saxony-Anhalt
People from Mansfeld-Südharz